Drepanornis is a genus of bird-of-paradise found in forests of New Guinea. They have long decurved sickle-like bills and an overall brown plumage.

The genus is sometimes considered a subgenus of Epimachus, but the two members of Drepanornis have a far shorter tail and their sexual dimorphism is less extreme.

Species
 Black-billed sicklebill, Drepanornis albertisi.
 Pale-billed sicklebill, Drepanornis bruijnii.

References

External links
 

 
Bird genera
 
Taxa named by Philip Sclater